William A. Gleason is an American academic. He is the Hughes-Rogers Professor of English and chair of the English department at Princeton University. He is the author of two books.

References

Living people
Amherst College alumni
University of California, Los Angeles alumni
Princeton University faculty
Year of birth missing (living people)